The original soundtrack album for the fourth season of the Netflix series Stranger Things, titled Stranger Things 4, was released digitally on July 1, 2022, via Lakeshore and Invada Records. Like the previous three seasons, the soundtrack was composed by Kyle Dixon and Michael Stein of the electronic band Survive. The album will also be released on physical formats such as CD and vinyl  in two separate volumes, as the sheer length of the eighty-track score far exceeds the capacity of a single compact disc or a two-disc vinyl set. These will be released December 2, 2022.

Track listing

References

Music of Stranger Things
Television soundtracks
2022 soundtrack albums